The term University of the Valley could refer to the following:

 University of Valle, one of the biggest and most important universities in Colombia.
 University of the Valley (Costa Rica)
 University of the Valley of Atemajac
 University of the Valley of Guatemala, the first private university in Guatemala.
 University of the Valley of Itajaí
 University of the Valley of Mexico, a for-profit university in Mexico.